The Mare aux Songes swamp is a lagerstätte located close to the sea in south eastern Mauritius. Many subfossils of recently extinct animals have accumulated in the swamp, which was once a lake, and some of the first subfossil remains of dodos were found there.

History 
In 1865, government schoolmaster at Mahébourg, George Clark, finally found an abundance of subfossil dodo bones in the swamp of Mare aux Songes in Southern Mauritius, after searching for thirty years, having been inspired by Strickland & Melville's monograph about the bird. In 1866, Clark explained his procedure to The Ibis, an ornithology journal:

Remains of over 300 dodos were found in the swamp, but only very few skull and wing bones among them, which may be explained by the upper bodies having been washed away or scavenged while the lower body was trapped, which is similar to the way many moa remains have been found in New Zealand marshes. In 1889, Théodor Sauzier was commissioned to find more dodo remains in the Mare aux Songes. He was successful, and also found remains of other extinct species. Twenty-six museums worldwide have significant holdings of dodo material, almost all found in the Mare aux Songes.

In October 2005, after a hundred years of neglect, a part of the Mare aux Songes swamp was excavated by an international team of researchers. To prevent Malaria, the British had covered the swamp in hard core during their rule over Mauritius, which had to be removed. Many remains were found, including bones of dodos in various stages of maturity, and several bones obviously from the skeleton of one individual dodo, which have been preserved in their natural position. These findings were made public in December 2005 in the Naturalis museum in Leiden. Of the fossils found in the swamp, 63% belonged to turtles of the extinct genus Cylindraspis, and 7.1% belonged to dodos, which had been deposited within several centuries, 4000 years ago. Subsequent excavations suggested that dodos, along with other animals, became mired in the Mare aux Songes while trying to reach water during a long period of severe drought about 4,200 years ago.

Paleofauna

The following animals have been identified from fossils in the Mare aux Songes.

Birds

Reptiles

Mammals

References 

Pleistocene paleontological sites of Africa
Wetlands of Mauritius
Swamps of Africa
Lagerstätten